The 2021 Cherokee Nation elections took place on July 5, 2021, and  July 24, 2021. The Cherokee Nation's Tribal Council is made up of seventeen Tribal Councilors elected from the fifteen districts within the reservation boundaries and two at-large seats.

In 2021, elections were held for districts 2, 4, 5, 7, 9, 10, 11, 15, and for one of the at-large seats.

The 2021 Cherokee Nation elections were the first Cherokee Nation elections to have their official results posted online, with results posted on election.cherokee.org. Prior to 2021, results would be posted on the window of the election commission building for public viewing. Social distancing and mask wearing were required at polling places as well due to an executive order issued by Principal Chief Chuck Hoskin Jr.

Retiring
Term Limited
Joe Byrd, district 2
Harley Buzzard, district 10
Janees Taylor, district 15 
Retiring
Canaan Duncan, district 7
Mary Baker Shaw, at-large district

General Election
Nine of the seventeen seats on the Cherokee Nation Tribal Council had elections in 2021. In order to win a seat on the Tribal Council, a candidate must receive 50% plus one vote. If no candidate receives 50%  
plus one vote, then a runoff election is held between the two top vote earning candidates.

Incumbent Tribal Councilors Mike Dobbins, E.O. Smith, Mike Shambaugh, and Victoria Vazquez won their seats outright in the general election. Danny Callison, a retired teacher, defeated former Tribal Councilor Meredith Frailey in district 15.

Districts 2, 7, 10, and the at-large seat all proceeded to runoff elections.

The voter turnout for the June 5th general election was 8,940 out of 55,597, or 16.08%.

District 2
Incumbent Tribal Councilor Joe Byrd was term limited.

Candidates
Candessa Tehee
Dusty Fore
Vicki Creel
Claude Stover
Bobby Stover
Tonya Teaney
Jami Murphy

Election Results

District 4
Candidates
Sarah Cowett
Mike Dobbins, Incumbent Tribal Councilor and former dentist

Election Results

District 5
Candidates
E.O. Smith, Incumbent Tribal Councilor
Richard W. Tyler
RL Bell

Election Results

District 7
Incumbent Tribal Councilor Canaan Duncan did not file for re-election.

Candidates
Gena Kirk
David Comingdeer
Joshua Sam

Election Results

District 9
Candidates
Mike Shambaugh, Incumbent Tribal Councilor and Jay Police Chief
Lawrence Panther
Joyce Nix McCarter

Election Results

District 10
Incumbent Tribal Councilor Harley Buzzard was term limited

Candidates
Melvina Shotpouch, former Tribal Councilor of three terms
Darrel Hicks
Shaunda Handle-Davis
Cody Williams
Dennis Ackley
John Ann Masters Thompson

Election Results

District 11
Candidates
Mason Hudson
Victoria M. Vazquez, Incumbent Tribal Councilor
Randy Junior White
Mike Purcell

Election Results

District 15
Incumbent Tribal Councilor Janees Taylor was term limited after serving two consecutive terms on the Tribal Council.

Candidates
Danny Callison, retired teacher of Mayes County
Meredith Frailey, former Tribal Councillor

Election Results

At-Large District
Incumbent Mary Baker Shaw did not run for re-election.

Candidates
Wallace Ryan Craig
Marilyn Vann
Mary-Charlotte Grayson
Shawna Johnson
Matthew Benjamin Scraper
Robin Mayes
Kyle Haskins
Johnny Jack Kidwell

Election Results

Runoff Election
Districts 2, 7, 10, and the at-large seat all had runoff elections.

Current results are unofficial numbers released by the Cherokee Nation.

District 2
Bobby Slover and Candessa Tehee advanced to the runoff election for district 2.

On July 25, Candess Teehee, of Tahlequah, Oklahoma, was reported  as the unofficial winner of the district 2 by seven votes by the Cherokee Phoenix. However eighteen ballots had been challenged and a recount was still possible.

Election Results

District 7
Joshua Sam and David Coming deer advanced to the runoff election for district 7.

Joshua Sam, of Stilwell, Oklahoma, won the Tribal Council race.

Election Results

District 10
Shaunda Handle-Davis and Melvina Shotpouch advanced to the runoff election for district 10.

Melvina Shotpouch, of Eucha, Oklahoma, won the Tribal Council race.

Election Results

At-Large District
Johnny Jack Kidwell and Kyle Haskins advanced to the runoff election for the at-large district.

Johnny Jack Kidwell, of Tulsa, Oklahoma, won the Tribal Council race.

Election Results

District 2 Election Fraud
In May 2021, a campaign volunteer for Bobby Slover in district 2, Lisa Dawn Cookson, was arrested and charged with election fraud for filling out and signing absentee ballot request forms without the consent of voters. Over 90 ballots were effected. Cookson was charged with one count of election fraud and six counts of false personation. Each count of election fraud or false personation carries a penalty of up to three years per count or a maximum fine of $15,000. On July 15, Cookson pleaded not guilty to the charges.

On July 21, 2021, the Cherokee Nation Attorney General's office charged losing candidate Bobby Slover with "unlawfully and knowingly" accepting a $1,000 donation from the corporation Action Floors LLC. Cherokee Nation election law states that donations may only be made by "individual natural persons". On August 2, 2021, the Cherokee Nation Election Commission fined Slover $3,000 and disqualified him from the race.

Legal challenges

On February 1, 2021, candidate Robin Mayes filed a legal challenge to disqualify Marilyn Vann from the election on the basis she did not meet the Cherokee "by blood" requirement to hold office in the Cherokee Constitution. Mayes argued that freedmen, the descendants of slaves owned by Cherokee citizens, were ineligible from holding office in the Cherokee Nation. On February 21, 2021, the Cherokee Nation Supreme Court ruled that the "by blood" language in Cherokee law is void and should be removed in line with Cherokee Nation v. Nash. Vann remained on the ballot.

On June 14, 2021, candidate Robin Mayes filed a legal challenge to the June 5th election and requested a new election. Mayes argued that the Cherokee Nation Supreme Court's striking of "by blood" requirements for office should "void" the election. The complaint was dismissed by the Cherokee Nation Supreme Court and described as a "frivolous action".

On August 3, 2021, the Cherokee Nation Supreme Court rejected petitions for recounts of the run-off elections in districts 2 and 7.

On August 8, 2021, the Cherokee Nation Supreme Court rejected a complaint alleging voter fraud in district 7 as "frivolous and dismissed with prejudice for failure to state a claim upon which relief can be granted."

References

Cherokee Nation
Cherokee Nation
Cherokee Nation elections